Dismorphia niepelti is a butterfly in the family Pieridae. It is found in Ecuador and Peru.

References

Dismorphiinae
Butterflies described in 1909